Estradiol benzoate butyrate (EBB), sold under the brand names Neolutin N, Redimen, Soluna, and Unijab and formerly known under the developmental code name Unimens, is an estrogen medication which is used in hormonal birth control for women. It is formulated in combination with dihydroxyprogesterone acetophenide (DHPA; algestone acetophenide), a progestin, and is used specifically as a combined injectable contraceptive. EBB is not available for medical use alone. The medication, in combination with DHPA, is given by injection into muscle once a month.

Side effects of EBB include breast tenderness, breast enlargement, nausea, headache, and fluid retention. EBB is an estrogen and hence is an agonist of the estrogen receptor, the biological target of estrogens like estradiol. It is an estrogen ester and a prodrug of estradiol in the body. Because of this, it is considered to be a natural and bioidentical form of estrogen.

EBB was first described in 1938. It was developed for use as a form of birth control in the 1970s and was introduced for medical use for this indication by the 1980s. The medication is used in combination with DHPA as a combined injectable contraceptive in Peru and Singapore.

Medical uses
EBB is used in combination with DHPA as a once-a-month combined injectable contraceptive to prevent pregnancy in women.

Available forms

The combination of EBB and DHPA contains 10 mg estradiol benzoate butyrate (EBB), an estrogen, and 150 mg algestone acetophenide (dihydroxyprogesterone acetophenide; DHPA), a progestin.

Side effects
The combination of EBB and DHPA is said to be associated with poor control of menstrual bleeding when used as a once-a-month combined injectable contraceptive.

Pharmacology

Pharmacodynamics

EBB is an estradiol ester, or a prodrug of estradiol. As such, it is an estrogen, or an agonist of the estrogen receptors. EBB is of about 64% higher molecular weight than estradiol due to the presence of its C3 benzoate and C17β butyrate esters. Because EBB is a prodrug of estradiol, it is considered to be a natural and bioidentical form of estrogen.

The estrogenic potency of oral ethinylestradiol is approximately 30-fold higher than that of parenteral EBB. In accordance, 50 μg/day oral ethinylestradiol has been reported to be about 3 times stronger in estrogenic effect than once-a-month injections of 10 mg EBB.

Pharmacokinetics

A single 10 mg intramuscular injection of EBB has a duration of approximately 3 weeks. Its duration is shorter than that of estradiol enantate. A preliminary study of the duration of EBB relative to other estradiol esters was conducted in 1952.

Chemistry

EBB is a synthetic estrane steroid and the C3 benzoate (benzenecarboxylate) and C17β butyrate (butanoate) diester of estradiol. It is also known as estradiol 3-benzoate 17β-n-butyrate or as estra-1,3,5(10)-triene-3,17β-diol 3-benzoate 17β-n-butyrate.

The experimental octanol/water partition coefficient (logP) of EBB is 6.3.

History
EBB, along with a variety of other estradiol esters, was first described in 1938 by Karl Miescher and colleagues of Ciba in Basel, Switzerland. It was developed in combination with DHPA as a combined injectable contraceptive in the 1970s. The combination was marketed for use as a combined injectable contraceptive in Peru by 1987.

Society and culture

Brand names
EBB is marketed in combination with DHPA under the brand names Neolutin N, Redimen, Soluna, and Unijab.<ref name=" It was originally developed under the tentative brand name Unimens, but ultimately was not marketed under this particular brand name.

Availability
The combination of EBB and DHPA is available only in Peru and Singapore.

See also
 Estradiol benzoate butyrate/dihydroxyprogesterone acetophenide

References

Benzoate esters
Butyrate esters
Estradiol esters
Prodrugs
Synthetic estrogens